John Charles Aitchison (6 April 1911 – 3 September 1976) was an Australian rules footballer who played with Hawthorn in the Victorian Football League (VFL).

Notes

External links 

1911 births
1976 deaths
Australian rules footballers from Victoria (Australia)
Hawthorn Football Club players